Dulla may refer to:
 Dulla (organ), a pink organ in the throats of camels, displayed out of the mouth during courtship.
 Dulla, Bangladesh, a populated place in Bangladesh.
 Dulla Bhatti, a Punjabi fighter.
 Goth Dulla Lakhan, a village in Pakistan.

See also
 Dullah, a village in Pakistan.
 Dullar, an Indian clan.
 Dula
 Doula